Anbarsar or Anbar Sar may refer to:
 Anbar Sar, Gilan
 Anbarsar, Mazandaran